Luis Rolando Redondo Guifarro (born 20 January 1973) is a Honduran politician and engineer, serving as deputy and disputed president of the National Congress of Honduras since 25 January 2022.

Early life and career 
Redondo began as a businessman in San Pedro Sula. He got involved supporting the Honduras National Team, traveling everywhere they played, becoming head of the barra since 2004. In that same year he met Salvador Nasralla, with whom he began a friendship. He traveled to the 2010 and 2014 World Cups, along with the national team. In 2011, he supported Nasralla for the creation of the Anti-Corruption Party and, in turn, became a candidate for deputy to Congress, in the 2013 election, in which he was elected.

Presidential dispute 
In 2016, a crisis began within the Anti-Corruption Party with Nasralla being accused of being "badly advised" which led to a dispute between Nasralla and Marlene Alvarenga about which of them would become the party's presidential candidate, the latter winning the dispute, while Nasralla would be appointed as the LIBRE-PINU presidential candidate. Redondo left PAC and joined PINU to run for Congress, being elected.

Congressional president and leadership dispute 
In October 2021, the presidential candidates for PSH and LIBRE, Salvador Nasralla and Xiomara Castro, respectively, struck an alliance. Part of the agreement for Nasralla to step down as a candidate and endorse Castro was that if they were able to gain a majority in Congress, the head of Congress would be a member of the Savior Party. Castro's party won 50 seats, whilst Nasralla's party won 10. On December 23, during a livestream, Nasralla announced his endorsement for Luis Redondo to become the President of the Congress. The next morning, Castro followed suit. When the newly elected congress voted for a congressional president on 21 January 2022, 18 deputies from Castro's party refused to honour the agreement. Instead, with support from opposition parties they voted for Jorge Cálix, a member of LIBRE, rather than Redondo. Nasralla commented on the incident as "another coup like in 2009". As a consequence, the 18 deputies were expelled from LIBRE. The dispute was resolved when Cálix agreed to renounce his claim to the Presidency of the Congress, allowing Redondo to lead the Congress. Cálix's and the expelled deputies' membership of LIBRE was subsequently restored by LIBRE's leader Manuel Zelaya.

References

1973 births
Living people
People from Tegucigalpa
Presidents of the National Congress of Honduras
21st-century Honduran politicians